"Heast as net" is a cover version of a song originally written by Hubert Achleitner (better known by his stage name Hubert von Goisern) and Wolfgang Staribacher performed by the Austrian singers Conchita Wurst and Ina Regen. The single by Wurst and Regen was released as a digital download on 15 December 2017 through Sony Music Entertainment and peaked at number 36 on the Austrian Singles Chart.

Music video
An official music video to accompany the release of "Heast as net" was first released onto YouTube on 30 November 2017 at a total length of four minutes and twenty-five seconds.

Track listing

Charts

Release history

References

2017 songs
2017 singles
Conchita Wurst songs